Year 959 (CMLIX) was a common year starting on Saturday (link will display the full calendar) of the Julian calendar.

Events 
 By place 

 Byzantine Empire 
 April - May – The Byzantines refuse to pay the yearly tribute. A Hungarian army, led by Apor, invades Macedonia and Thrace. He plunders its territories until reaching Constantinople. On his way back, Apor is defeated during a night attack by Byzantine forces.
 November 9 – Emperor Constantine VII Porphyrogennetos ("born in the purple") dies at Constantinople after a 46-year reign. He is succeeded by his 21-year-old son Romanos II as ruler of the Byzantine Empire.
 Winter – Romanos II appoints Leo Phokas (the Younger) to be commander of the Byzantine field army (Domestic of the Schools) in the West. The Phokas clan becomes one of the leading families in Constantinople.

 Europe 
 Bruno I, archbishop and duke (archduke) of Lotharingia resigns. His brother, King Otto I divides the duchy in two parts – Upper Lorraine and Lower Lorraine. He appoints Frederick I and Godfrey I as margraves (vice-duke). 
 Pietro III Candiano, doge of Venice, dies after a 17-year reign. He is succeeded by his son Pietro IV Candiano, who breaks off his campaign in Spoleto on behalf of King Berengar II of Italy and returns to Venice. 
 Pietro IV Candiano divorces his wife Joanna for political reasons and banishes her as a nun to the monastery of San Zaccaria.

 England 
 October 1 – King Eadwig dies after a 4-year reign. He is succeeded by his 16-year-old brother Edgar I (the Peaceful), who effectively completes the unification of England, when Northumbria submits to his rule.

 By topic 

 Religion 
 Dunstan, bishop of Worcester and London, is appointed by Edgar I as archbishop of Canterbury and becomes his chief adviser.

Births 
 April 12 – En'yū, emperor of Japan (d. 991)
 Yeshe-Ö, Tibetan lama-king (approximate date)
 Zhao Defang, prince of the Song Dynasty (d. 981)

Deaths 
 July 27 – Chai Rong, emperor of Later Zhou (b. 921)
 October 1 – Eadwig (the All Fair), king of England
 October 3 – Gérard of Brogne, Frankish abbot
 November 9 – Constantine VII, Byzantine emperor (b. 905)
 Ælfsige (or Aelfsige), archbishop of Canterbury
 Chen Jue, Chinese official and chief of staff
 Donnchadh mac Urchadh, king of Maigh Seóla (Ireland)
 Han Yanhui, Chinese Khitan chancellor (b. 882)
 Pietro III Candiano, doge of Venice
 Song Qiqiu, Chinese chief strategist (b. 887)

References